Special Edition is a 1938 British thriller film directed by Redd Davis and starring Lucille Lisle, John Garrick and Norman Pierce.

It was made by at Isleworth Studios as a quota quickie for released by Paramount British Pictures.

Synopsis
A reporter investigates a murder case, and proves that a photographer is really a killer.

Cast
 Lucille Lisle as Sheila Pearson 
 John Garrick as Frank Warde 
 Norman Pierce as Aiken 
 Johnnie Schofield as Horatio Adams 
 Frederick Culley as Dr. Pearson 
 Vera Bogetti as Mrs. Howard 
 Mabel Twemlow as Mrs. Cavendish 
 Vincent Holman as Inspector Bourne 
 Dino Galvani as Toni Lang 
 Fewlass Llewellyn as Coroner

References

Bibliography
 Chibnall, Steve. Quota Quickies: The British of the British 'B' Film. British Film Institute, 2007.
 Low, Rachael. Filmmaking in 1930s Britain. George Allen & Unwin, 1985.
 Wood, Linda. British Films, 1927–1939. British Film Institute, 1986.

External links

1938 films
British thriller films
British black-and-white films
1930s thriller films
Films directed by Redd Davis
Films shot at Isleworth Studios
Quota quickies
Paramount Pictures films
1930s English-language films
1930s British films